U Aquilae is a binary star system in the constellation Aquila, Located approximately  away from Earth.

The secondary (component B) is a blue main-sequence star, twice the mass of the sun and around thirty times more luminous. It is hotter than the primary star at 9,300 K, but much smaller and fainter. The two stars orbit every five years and their separation varies from five to seven astronomical units in a mildly eccentric orbit.

u Aql A is a classical Cepheid variable star ranging between magnitudes 6.08 and 6.86 over a period of 7.02 days.  It is an evolved star which has exhausted its core hydrogen and is now fusing helium into carbon.

References

Aquila (constellation)
Binary stars
Classical Cepheid variables
Aquilae, U
183344
7402
095820
Durchmusterung objects
F-type supergiants
B-type main-sequence stars
F-type bright giants